Spielbank-Affäre is an East German film. It was released in 1957.

The film is set in West Germany, starring actors from the West German film industry.

External links
 

1957 films
East German films
1950s German-language films
1950s German films